Felipe Ramírez was a Spanish painter of Seville, active as a still-life painter during the 17th century. He was probably a relation of Gerónimo Ramírez, and was active at the same period. He painted hunting-pictures, dead game, birds, and various other subjects.  He also painted a Still Life with Cardoon, Francolin, Grapes and Irises which is now at the Museo del Prado in Madrid and a Martyrdom of St. Stephen for a church in Seville, Spain.

Works

Still Life with Cardoon, Francolin, Grapes and Irises (1628), 71 x 92 cm, Musel del Prado, Madrid
Varón de Dolores (1631), now in the private collection in Belgium

References

Pérez Sánchez, Alfonso E. (1983). Pintura española de bodegones y floreros de 1600 a Goya. Museo del Prado, Madrid, Ministry of Culture. p. 29 and 35. .
Museo del Prado (1995). La belleza de lo real. Floreros y bodegones en el Museo del Prado 1600-1800. Madrid, Publyco S.A. p. 43–45. .

External links

 Felipe Ramírez at the Museo del Prado Online Encyclopedia 

Painters from Seville
17th-century Spanish painters
Spanish male painters
Spanish Baroque painters
Spanish bodegón painters
Year of death missing
Year of birth missing